The Marquette was a passenger train operated by the Chicago, Milwaukee, St. Paul and Pacific Railroad ("Milwaukee Road") between Chicago and Mason City, Iowa. Service began in 1937, but was eliminated by 1955. Despite the elimination of the Marquette, the line continued to see service by the Sioux until 1960, when that service was cut back to Madison, Wisconsin.

References 

Named passenger trains of the United States
Passenger trains of the Milwaukee Road
Passenger rail transportation in Wisconsin
Passenger rail transportation in Iowa
Passenger rail transportation in Illinois
Railway services introduced in 1937